Tais Teng (born 1952 in The Hague) is the pen name of a Dutch writer of fantasy fiction, hardboiled detective, children's books and science fiction. Additionally, Teng works as an illustrator, sculptor, and writing coach. His real name is Thijs van Ebbenhorst Tengbergen, which he was subsequently forced to shorten (as revealed on his interview with Mad Scientist Journal) due to spacing issues on the covers of his books.  Other pen names he has used are Eban Hourst and Ben Bergen, which reflect his search for a pseudonym that was pronounceable in languages other than Dutch.

Tais Teng has written more than a hundred novels both for adults and children in the Dutch language. He has won the Paul Harland Prize four times. His books have been translated in German, Finnish, French and English, with Teng himself being a Dutch and English bilingual writer.

He has co-authored short stories and novels with Paul Harland, Eddy C. Bertin, Bies van Ede, Roderick Leeuwenhart, Roelof Goudriaan and Jaap Boekestein.

Griezelgenootschap

In the Netherlands, Tais Teng is best known as a member of the Griezelgenootschap, a group of Dutch horror writers who published yearbooks of horror stories and gave performances and signing sessions for interested fans from 1994 to 2003. Paul van Loon was the chairman of the organization. 

Tais Teng wrote the three-novel-series Duisterlingen (Darklings) with Eddy C. Bertin and Bies van Ede about three children with special powers who can travel into the nightmarish dreamland Yldorgei. As a member, Tais Teng produced two dozen more horror novels, ranging from Middle Grade to Young Adult. His most popular series was the Griezelklas (Monsterclass) for very special children. Plot points included a long-suffering teacher who has to keep order in a class with vampire sisters, a man-eating kelpie, a witch, a hot-tempered dwarf with a sledgehammer and half a dozen more dangerous pupils.

Literary influences

Homegrown Dutch science fiction
When Tais Teng started reading in earnest, fantasy was almost nonexistent in the Netherlands. However, science fiction flourished, with most of it being homegrown. He grew up with the idea that the Dutch engineering know-how would put them on the Moon and Mars first. Monus, de Man van de Maan (Monus, the Man from the Moon) by A.D. Hildebrandt was an extremely popular audioplay that was aired every week. Wim van der Gaag wrote with De Kristallen Tiran (The Crystal Tiran) a kind of cyberpunk avant la lettre: with very short and very information-dense sentences. The tale about a war between an earthly computer system and a vegetative brain of Mars made Teng decide that he wanted to be a writer. It was partly due to the style: the revelation that one could tell so many original things on a single page. It is a style he still enjoys using for any of his Hard science fiction stories.

English SF and fantasy
When Teng started writing, Jack Vance was the most influential writer for fledgling Dutch sci-fi writers at the time, more so than Robert Heinlein and Isaac Asimov. Teng wanted to write like him, but it soon became apparent that imitating his style wasn't enough: he still had to have a good tale. Several of Tais Teng's first stories were Jack Vance imitations.In 2019, he wrote the novel Phaedra: Alastor 824, an authorized sequel to the Alastor Cluster novels of the grandmaster himself. It was published by Spatterlight Press as part of the Paladins of Vance imprint. Several older fantasy writers inspired him, most notably Lord Dunsany with The Gods of Pegana These very short stories form an early example of Flash stories.The same is the case of several stories set in The Night Land of William Hope Hodgson and the Zothique tales inspired by Clark Ashton Smith. With Paul Harland, he co-wrote Computer Code Cthulhu, a Cthulhu Mythos novel set in the near future. The horror writer H. P. Lovecraft remains a strong influence in his horror stories with Teng naming his first English collection Lovecraft, My Love.

The Dutch Ziltpunk movement
Tais Teng is one of the founders of Ziltpunk, a literary movement that seeks to counter the apathetic dismay of many Dystopian novels. The Ziltpunk stories belong to climate fiction, which looks for solutions to the everchanging climate crisis. It is also the Dutch equivalent of solarpunk.
The rising of the sea level is a rather urgent problem for the Dutch, with half of their land lying below sea level. For instance, Al Gore didn't see much of a future for the Dutch in An Inconvenient Truth.
Ziltpunk describes massive geoengineering projects which writers consider the only way to counter the climate changes. Sixty meter high dikes, mangrove islands planted in the sea to counter floodwaves, or even raising the land itself by injecting the underlying chalk layers with hydrogen sulfide are some key examples in the text. 
The stories seldom describe a rosy utopia. In it, survival with some joie de vivre is enough. The focus of the Ziltpunk stories is mainly set in the Netherlands, with a mentality reminiscent of the Golden Age Science Fiction.
Part of the ziltpunk future is described in Teng's works are already here. The Dutch are building ever higher dunes along the sea coast and movable dikes like the Maeslantkering to control both the sea and rivers.To date, the ziltpunk movement has published three novels and some two dozen stories. Roderick Leeuwenhart and Johan Klein Haneveld recently joined the founders and wrote their own stories and novels.Several ziltpunk stories have been published in English. Examples include Any House in the Storm, Tidal Treasures or Growing Up Along the Mile-High Dyke, Buitendyks, and Where the Night-Gulls Yodel.

Bibliography
(English works only, see the Dutch Wikipedia version for novels in that language)

Novels and collections
 The Emerald Boy (YA novel), Miyu Magic stones, 
 With Musket and Ducat (novella), XIII Stories of Transformation
 Embrace the Night (novella set in the Nightland of Willam Hope Hodgson), nightland.website
 Lovecraft, my love (collection)
 Embrace the night and other stories (collection)
 Phaedra: Alastor 824 (novel, in the Alastor Cluster series), Spatterlight Press
 When the Night-gaunt Knows your Name (Children's book)

Short stories
 "Slow as glaciers and their swords all aflame," Aurelia Lion
 "Praying to Thasaidon," Cirsova (set in Clark Ashton Smith's Zothique)
 "Riders on the storm," Dimension Six 
 "Walking the thrice-blessed road," Stories for the Thoughtful Young
 "The shipwright's Lover," Longshot Island 9 (set in Clark Ashton Smith's Zothique)
 "True silk," Unreal 4
 "Make the second shot count," Low life Journal
 "Slow-boat inspector," Daily science fiction
 "Playing stalker in the night," Itty Bitty writing space
 "Ice words and fire fonts," Mad scientist Journal
 "A perfect day with the dead men shrieking and the sky filled with northern light," Red Sun magazine (Cthulhu Mythos)
 "Why we are standing on a broken wall, clutching swords too rusty to take an edge," Battling in all her finery
 "You should have seen their faces," Daily Science Fiction
 "The story of Mynheer Reynaerde and the purloined tails," The Worlds of Science Fiction, Fantasy and Horror
 "Assassin's Scroll," Black cat magazine
 "In her fingerless hands she holds the ice and all the oceans," Unfit Magazine 
 "Tidal Treasure, or Growing up along the Mile-high Dyke," Future science fiction digest
 "Watching the Space-stations Rise," Write Ahead, volume 2
 "The Magician's Left Hand," Switchblade #6
 "Doch das Messer sieht man nicht," Switchblade #4
 "The cowboy who loved lady Liberty," Albedo One #47
 "America first," More Alternative truths
 "Dancing for Azathoth," The Worlds of Science Fiction, Fantasy and Horror (Cthulhu Mythos)
 "For the greater good of all," Singular Irregularity
 "Growing up with your dead sister," Pulp Literature #8
 "Tokyo Nights," Tokyo Yakuza: Issues #1 - #24
 "Any house in the storm," Crossed Genres
 "An Overview of the Infernal Regions," Hell II: Citizens
 "Al-Adrian and the magic lamp," Faery wicked tales
 "The art of losing wars gracefully,"  The end is the beginning
 "The further adventures of Jesus: The First seal: Conquest"
 "And the sky is filled with eyes," nightland.website (set in William Hope Hodgson's Night Land)
 "Respect of Headwaiters," Perihelion Science Fiction (12-AUG-2014)
 "Expiating ancestral sins," Albedo One #31 (2006)
 "Crowned by Lightning," Albedo One #18 (1998)
 "A Girl Like Tiadi," Pandora #21 (1988)
 "Green-ache," Amazing (Nov. 1989)
 "Worthy enemy," Hardboiled #10
 "What Avails a Psalm in the Cinders of Gehenna?,"  SF International #2 (1987) 
 "Palimpsests," Dragon
 "Disslish the Aquamancer," Terra sf

Essays
 "The joy of very long titles and why publishers hate them," Mythaxis The Joy of Very Long Titles and Why Publishers Hate Them!
 "Channeling Jack Vance, shared worlds and writing in another man's universe" Mythaxis Channeling Jack Vance: shared worlds and writing in another man's universe
 "Better not call your dark lord Bill Smith," Mythaxis 
 "Five steps closer to the ending of your novel," Mythaxis
 "Artist interview with Michael Swanwick," Mythaxis
 "First lines or how to seduce your editor," Mythaxis
 "Make Your Own Book of Spells: How to Use Grimoires and Unholy Scrolls from Ancient Tombs," Mythaxis

Art
Tais Teng began selling his artwork in 1981, the same year he wrote his first children's book and published a SF collection for adults.He got his start by making B & W interior illustrations for Atlan, a spin-off of the German SF series Perry Rhodan. This was Space Opera: he had to draw a lot of exploding starships, robots and aliens.At the same time he got a commission to paint the SF covers for CentriPress, most notably the Jerry Cornelius novels by Michael Moorcock.
He used oils and acrylic paint, and while oil paint looked better, it also took a fortnight to dry, which proved to be a problem when working for demanding publishers. He soon switched to Airbrushing. The technique was perfect for painting the surrealistic, Salvador Dalí inspired twilight skies often seen in science fiction. Regardless, the painting was easily spoiled when the flow of paint started spattering. For each part of the picture Teng also had to cut out plastic stencils to preserve earlier parts.When Photoshop came around, he embraced digital painting. Nowadays, Tais Teng makes use of computer generated Fractals and kaleidoscopic mandalas to construct his landscapes. An avid photographer, he has an extensive databank of figures and objects. For his Black & White illustrations, he often uses Scraperboard or digital etchings.
He also paints murals and background decors for plays, which he had trained as a decor painter at art academy Artibus in Utrecht.

Pulp Literature Press 
 Pulp Literature, Issue 3, 2014
 Pulp Literature, Issue 6, 2015
 Pulp Literature, Issue 9, 2016
 Pulp Literature, Issue 19, 2018

Sculpture
Tais Teng mainly works in marl, a rather soft stone that was used by medieval artisans to decorate cathedrals with saint and gargoyles. Being a horror writer, he prefers making gargoyles. For smaller pieces, he also uses springstone, a hard material often used in African art.The marl statues come in block of 20-20-60 centimeter. They are stacked with the lower piece forming a decorated plinth. He often uses these statues as part of a cover image, integrating them with the rest of the picture.

Trivia
Tais Teng often uses lengthy titles to tell their own mini-tales for his short stories. Two of his most extreme samples include: "Why we are standing on a broken wall, clutching swords too rusty to take an edge" and "A perfect day with the dead men shrieking and the sky filled with northern light."

When asked what his most heartfelt wish was, he answered it as a sculptor: "A Star Wars laser cannon to carve mountains or one of Jupiter's moons."

Further reading and sources
 Van Duin, John, Ziltpunk: zeker geen zure bedoening, HSF (2019/1) Ziltpunk: zeker geen zure bedoening – HSF (2019/1) – NCSF
 de Valk, Arnold, Abstracte kunst heeft meestal geen verhaal, Amersfoorts Dagblad, 28 June 2017 
Tais Teng
 Bruinsma Robin, Als de dood voor kleine foutjes, Algemeen Dagblad, 9 May 2007 
 Verschuren, Herman, Lezen over Tais Teng, 
 Nielsch, Astrid (interview with tais Teng about his art Asni's Art Blog: Interview with Tais Teng
 Barkel, Theo, De ideeënmachine Tais Teng SF Terra - De ideeënmachine Tais Teng
 Lindeboom, Martijn, De 5 w's van Tais Teng De 5 w's van Tais Teng
 Lodder, Arie, The Dutch are coming 2: Tais Teng The Dutch are coming 2: Tais Teng | Europa SF - The European Speculative Fiction portal
 Lodder, Arie, review Lovecraft, my love 
 Interview about Tais Teng's love of long titles in Mad Scientist journal An Interview with Tais Teng
 Q-magazine-edition 5, Schrijver van eigen bodem Schrijver van eigen bodem • Tais Teng
 Kaptein, Peter, Fantastische kunstenaars: Tais Teng Fantastische Kunstenaars: Tais Teng
 In de ban van de fantasy, Meer met media, September 2008 
 Adelmund, Martijn, De wilde werkelijkheid van Gran Terre, Warp, 2009,

References

External links
Author's website (Dutch)
Author's website (English)
Author's art website (English)

1952 births
Living people
Dutch fantasy writers
Dutch science fiction writers
Writers from The Hague
Dutch male novelists
Graphic artists
Cover artists
People from Amersfoort